Bridges is the second solo studio album by American rapper Sonny Seeza, an original member of multi-platinum hardcore rap group Onyx. The album was released digitally on February 26, 2016. The album was produced by DJ Tray, Jakebeatz, DJ Rad, DJ Def Cut, Dr. G, Ay-Cut, DJ Idem, San Fermin. It is his first album in 7 years, his last effort being 2009's Tytanium.

Background 
In 2011 Sonny Seeza was flown to Switzerland by Soni Keomanyvong from Loyal Unity Booking and Management, to do several live show performances around Switzerland. Later she became his booking agent, manager, and beloved girl. Then she introduced him to Matt, who was interested in doing an album project with Sonny Seeza through his label, Empire Music. Inspired by the new relationship, Sonsee start working on a second solo album "Bridges" at the studio PW Records in Basel, which was released on February 26, 2016.

Singles 
"Everywhere" was released as the album's single on January 29, 2016. The music video for this single was released on March 14, 2016.

Track listing

References

External links
 Bridges at Bandcamp

2016 albums
Sonny Seeza albums